The chart below shows the current enlisted rank insignia of the United States Army, with seniority, and pay grade, increasing from right to left. The enlisted ranks of  corporal (E-4) and higher are considered non-commissioned officers (NCOs). The rank of specialist is also in pay grade E-4, but does not hold non-commissioned officer status; it is common that a soldier may never hold the rank of corporal, and instead be promoted from specialist to sergeant, attaining junior NCO status at that time.

In the beginning, U.S. Army enlisted rank was indicated by colored epaulets. The use of chevrons came into being in 1821, with the orientation changing over time from point-down to point-up and back again, to the point-down orientation seen in the American Civil War. Around the turn of the 20th century, point-up wear of chevrons returned and has remained so.

History

1775–1821: epaulets

From the creation of the United States Army to 1821, non-commissioned officer (NCO) and staff non-commissioned officer (SNCO) rank was distinguished by the wearing of usually worsted epaulets.

From 1775 to 1779, sergeants and corporals wore one epaulet on the right shoulder, corporals of green color, sergeants of red color. From May 1778, the newly created ranks of SNCOs (i.e., sergeants major, quartermaster sergeants, drum majors, and fife majors) wore a red epaulette on each shoulder.

In 1779, sergeants were authorized two silk epaulets, corporals one worsted to wear on the right shoulder. The color was white (infantry), yellow (artillery), or blue (cavalry). In practice it seems the prescribed blue epaulettes for cavalry NCO never came in wide use while the wearing of white epaulettes prevailed.

By 1783/84, the Continental Army was discharged. For a few weeks, only 55 artillerymen at West Point and 25 men at Fort Pitt were to remain. In August 1784, the 700 men strong First American Regiment (including two companies of artillery) was organized as kind of an army substitute. In October 1786 by approval of Congress, this force should expand to a Legionary Corps of additional infantry, rifle troops, artillery, and dragoons. But this project never materialized. In 1791, the Second Regiment of Infantry was raised and organized as the First Regiment. Both units amalgamated in 1792 with the Legion of the United States, including artillery and dragoons (the first federal mounted force since the discharge of the Continental Light Dragoons in 1783), that then transformed into the US Army in 1796.

From 1787, SNCOs wore silk epaulets, sergeants two worsted and corporals one worsted. In the same year, the epaulets' color of cavalry NCOs officially changed from blue to white. At that time the federal mounted force of two troops of dragoons existed only on paper and never got beyond the planning stage (see above). The sergeant major insignia included a brass half-crescent placed on the skirt of the epaulet.

In 1799, red worsted epaulets were prescribed for all NCOs in all branches: SNCOs on both shoulders, sergeants on the right shoulder, corporals on the left. Chief musicians were identified by two white epaulets. Shortly after, in the year 1800, the color of the epaulets was changed to yellow, for chief musicians in to blue. In reality, the artillery NCOs ignored the order of 1799 and maintained their yellow epaulets, as did a company of bombardiers, sappers, and miners recruited during the War of 1812. In 1808 also the infantry NCOs switched back to their former white epaulets as did the newly raised light dragoons (whose remaining men and officers were folded into the Corps of Artillery, in 1815)., SNCOs wore two worsted epaulettes with crescent, sergeants had two plain worsted epaulettes, while corporals wore one epaulette on the right shoulder.

1821–1832: chevrons and "wings" vs. epaulettes
Between 1821 and 1895, the U.S. Army insignia of rank for enlisted soldiers above the grade of private was generally the chevron—a "V"-shaped piece of cloth or braid, typically worn on the sleeve. With exceptions from 1832 to 1846 (when chevrons were abolished), and from 1847 to 1851 (chevrons worn points up), the chevrons were a worn point down.

From 1821 to 1832, enlisted personnel (except staff, artillery, and engineers) wore dark blue "wings" trimmed in yellow (infantry, in white) on each shoulder and a horizontal row of four gold (infantry, silver) buttons on each cuff. Additionally, senior NCOs (quartermaster sergeant, sergeant major, drum major, and fife major) wore a single point-up yellow (infantry, white) chevron on each upper sleeve (from 1825 a chevron and arc), sergeants wore their chevrons on the lower sleeves (from 1825 on the upper sleeves), corporals had just a single chevron on the right upper sleeve (but from 1825 one chevron on both lower sleeves). This system echoed the grading system of company-grade officers from 1821 to 1832 (except general staff, artillery, engineer, and field officers who wore epaulets instead of "wings").

For enlisted personnel in staff, artillery, and engineers the system of epaulets (yellow for all grades) was retained: senior NCOs were indicated by a pair of epaulets with a brass crescent, sergeants with no crescents, and corporals just a single epaulet on the right shoulder.

From the early days of the Continental Army, the wearing of a sword and a crimson worsted sash had served as a badge of rank for all sergeant grades. Since 1821 the worsted sash became a privilege to first sergeants and above only. In 1872, sashes would cease being worn by all ranks (except for general officer ranks who retained their buff sashes until 1917). The wearing of the M1840 NCO sword would be abolished by general orders No. 77 dated August 6, 1875.

1832–1851: epaulettes and slashflaps
These parallel existing systems were superseded in 1832. From then on to 1851 (since 1846 only with dress uniform), enlisted personnel wore a pair of yellow (infantry, white) cloth epaulets with 2 1/2" long and 1/8" in diameter worsted fringe (privates, very short fringe). Contrary to this, senior NCOs wore epaulets with gold fringe (but from about 1835 worsted bullion with a metal crescent) and a coat with two rows of ten buttons, that ended 3 1/2" above the knees while all other enlisted personnel had single-breasted coats with nine buttons, that ended 7" above the knees.

In addition, there were on the cuffs a slashflap with yellow (infantry, white) lace and a vertical row of several golds (infantry, silver) buttons depending on grade: senior sergeants wore four flaps and buttons, sergeant wore three flaps and buttons, corporals and privates wore two flaps and buttons. A sergeant-major had a red plume on the dress hat; a quartermaster sergeant had a light blue plume. The orderly sergeant had no plume but wore a red waist sash.

After the two regiments of light dragoons were first amalgamated into one and then transferred to the artillery in 1814/15, a federal mounted force ceased to exist. In 1832, a battalion of United States Mounted Rangers was formed, just to be disbanded and replaced by the United States Regiment of Dragoons in 1833. In place of worsted epaulets, enlisted dragoon ranks wore metal (brass) shoulder scales, thus inspiring yellow as new branch color for mounted units.

1846–1903: chevrons point down (except for 1847-1851)

Complementary, for undress a new system of yellow (infantry: white) chevrons was introduced in 1846. In 1846 the chevrons were pointed down, from 1847 to 1851 they were pointing up. All sergeants were indicated by three chevrons: Sgt. Maj. and Qm. Sgt. additionally with a gold shoulder cord (1846) but from 1847 instead of three chevrons with three arcs below for Sgt. Maj., for Qm. Sgt. with three bars below. Orderly Sgt. (i.e. 1st Sgt.) in 1846 three chevrons and a red worsted waist sash, from 1847 a hollow diamond below the three chevrons and no waist sash. Corporals wore two chevrons, privates none.

However, in 1851, the Army changed to point down wear for all enlisted grades and directed that chevrons would be worn in the new branch-of-service colors of sky blue for the infantry, dark green for riflemen and mounted rifles, orange for dragoons (from 1851 to 1861), yellow for cavalry, red for artillery, and green for the medical department.

In 1895, the Army introduced a new enlisted rank system that became the basis for the system used in World War I.

Metal branch-of-service insignia was first adopted in 1832—the hunting horn being adopted as the infantry's insignia. They are worn on the cap with the regimental number inset in or just above it.

1902–present: chevrons point up

1902–1920

Smaller rank insignia that were to be worn point up was introduced in 1902, but with the transition from the older, larger point down insignia to the new versions, there was some confusion concerning the proper manner of wear of the new insignia. War Department Circular 61 of 1905 directed that the points be placed up and designated certain colors for each branch of the military, for uniformity.

During World War, I troops overseas in France used standard buff stripes inset with trade badges in the place of colored branch stripes or rank badges. Rank grades were numbered from the top-down, from the general of the army, as number 1, to corporal, number 19; NCO ranks were grades 13 through 19. Confusingly, pay grades were different, less senior ranks with more technical training being paid more than senior staff NCOs.

On 22 July 1919, the military approved "an arc of one bar" (a trade badge over a single arc "rocker") for a private first class. This was later changed to a single chevron in 1920.

1920–1942

The Joint Service Pay Readjustment Act of 1922 (Public Law 67-235; June 10, 1922) divided the grades into inverse "pay grades" for enlisted personnel (grades 7 through 1) and "pay periods" (periods 1 through 8) for officers. The pay rates would stay the same from July 1, 1922, to May 1942.

In 1920, the rank system was simplified, and the rank stripes were reduced to 3.125 inches in width. The rank of sergeant major was discontinued and the confusing system of trade badges and rank insignia was abolished. Branch-of-service colored stripes were abandoned in favor of standard buff-on-blue stripes. The use of bars under chevrons to designate senior support arm NCOs was abolished, and all branches used arcs under chevrons to denote senior NCOs. The rank insignia was reduced to seven grades and eight ranks (the first sergeant was considered a senior grade of technical sergeant) and were numbered from "G1" for the highest rank (master sergeant) to "G7" for the lowest (private second class). Subdued olive-drab-on-khaki stripes were created for wear with the class C khaki uniform.

The rank of specialist was adopted. It was grade G-6 but received a pay bonus from $5 (specialist sixth class) to $25 (specialist first class). Specialists had the same single chevron of a private first class but were considered between the ranks of private first class and corporal in seniority. This was very confusing, as the difference between a private first class and a specialist could not be determined at first glance, in addition to any specialty they may have had, as trade badges had been eliminated. Unofficial insignia adopted by post commands granted specialists one to six arcs under their chevron (ranging from one for specialist sixth class to six for specialist first class) to indicate their grade, and trade badges inset between their stripes to indicate their specialty.

1942–1948

In 1942, there were several reforms. The pay was increased for all ranks for the first time in two decades, and combat pay was introduced. The rank of the first sergeant was now considered a junior version of master sergeant and the confusing specialist ranks were abolished. The specialist ranks were replaced by the distinct ranks of technician third grade (equivalent to a staff sergeant), technician fourth grade (equivalent to a sergeant), and technician fifth grade (equivalent to a corporal). Technicians were inferior to non-commissioned officers of the same grade but superior to all grades below them. They had the same insignia as the regular rank of their grade, but with a cloth "T" inset below their stripes. The subdued insignia was abolished, but could still be worn with the Class C khaki uniform until they wore out.

1948–1956

In 1948, the pay grades were broken up into seven "E" (enlisted and non-commissioned officer), two "W" (warrant officer), and eleven "O" (officer) grades. The technician's ranks were abolished and were absorbed into their equivalent line ranks. The rank of private was divided into the ranks of private (Grade E7), private second class (Grade E6), and private first class (Grade E5). Corporal was regraded as Grade E4. Sergeant (Grade E3) was a career soldier rank and its former three-chevron insignia was abolished and replaced with the three chevrons and an arc of the rank of staff sergeant. The rank of staff sergeant was discontinued and the rank of technical sergeant (Grade E2) was renamed sergeant first class. The rank of first sergeant (Grade E1) was absorbed into the senior rank of master sergeant (Grade E1).

Also in 1948, the old buff-on-blue insignia was abolished. In their place was a new system of smaller (2 inches wide) and narrower chevrons and arcs that were instead differenced by color called the "Goldenlite" system - with subdued dark blue stripes on bright yellow backing for combat arms and yellow stripes on dark blue for support arms. They were not popular. Combat-arm NCOs found their stripes were hard to identify unless the viewer was very close, making it hard to rally and lead troops. Support-arm NCOs found their stripes too small to be easily seen at a distance, making it hard to tell their seniority at a glance. When the US Army entered the Korean War, it was found that troops in combat abandoned the new insignia. They either used the support arm stripes, purchased the old larger buff-on-blue stripes from post exchanges or Army / Navy stores, or used hand-cut or tailor-made copies. The small "Goldenlite" stripes were abandoned in February 1951 and the dark-blue-on-yellow insignia was abolished. Larger 3-inch-wide olive-drab-on-dark-blue stripes were adopted for servicemen.

In 1950, the Women's Army Corps (WAC) were issued new Goldenlite yellow-on-brown insignia for wear with the taupe WAC uniform. It was the same size as the men's small 2-inch-wide Goldenlite stripes. (Female personnel would wear the smaller 2-inch insignia until 1998, well after male personnel was issued larger, 3-inch-wide insignia in 1951.) In 1951, WACs were assigned surplus men's Goldenlite-yellow-on-dark-blue stripes for wear with olive drab or fatigue uniforms. Also in 1951, the optional white WAC dress uniform was now authorized for wear by enlisted and NCO ranks and 2-inch Goldenlite yellow-on-white stripes were created to be worn with it.

The 1950s brought a lot of changes. In 1951, the pay grade numbering was reversed, with the lowest enlisted rank being numbered "1" and the highest enlisted rank is "7". By 1955 (as stated in Army Regulation 615–15, dated 2 July 1954), new grade structures were announced reactivating the specialist rank: specialist 3rd class (E-4, or SP3), specialist 2nd class (E-5, or SP2), specialist 1st class (E-6, or SP1) and master specialist (E-7, or MSP). The specialist insignia was the same smaller and narrower size as the old Goldenlite stripes to differentiate specialists from non-commissioned officers.

1956–1985

In 1956, the Army began wearing polished black leather boots instead of the traditional unpolished russet leather (as late as the early 1980s, older soldiers who had served before 1956 said they were in the "brown boot" army.), and the army green uniform (with Goldenlite-Yellow-on-green rank stripes) was adopted. The new enlisted rank insignia were then used on all Army uniforms (e.g., green, khaki, and fatigue). Enlisted rank insignia with a blue background was worn on the army blue dress uniform.

In 1957, a 2-inch-wide set of Goldenlite-yellow-on-blue stripes were worn with the new optional army blue WAC dress uniform. In 1959, a 2-inch-wide set of Goldenlite-yellow-on-green stripes were worn with the new army green WAC duty uniform; they replaced the taupe WAC service uniform by 1961. Although the WAC was disestablished in 1978, the army green WAC uniform would be in use until 1985.

In 1958, as part of a rank restructuring, two pay grades and four ranks were added: sergeant (E-5) returned to its traditional three chevron insignia, E-6 became staff sergeant, which had been eliminated in 1948 (with its previous three chevrons and one arc insignia), sergeant first class became E-7, master sergeant became E-8, which included first sergeant and specialist 8; and E-9, which included sergeant major and specialist 9. In 1959, the specialist insignia was made the same size and width as non-commissioned officer's stripes. In 1961, the wearing of large Goldenlite-yellow-on-green stripes was adopted for use on all Army uniforms (green, khaki, and fatigue) except for the Army dress blue uniform, which used large insignia with a blue background. In 1965, the ranks of specialist 8 and specialist 9 were discontinued, and private first class was briefly termed lance corporal. 

In 1966, the rank of Sergeant Major of the Army was established, its holder an assistant to the Army chief of staff. Considered a higher grade than sergeant major (or than command sergeant major from 1968), the Sergeant Major of the Army didn't receive its unique rank insignia until 1979. In 1968, the rank of command sergeant major was established as an assistant to the commanding officer at battalion, brigade, division, and corps levels. Also, that year the insignia of the private first class received one arc under the chevron. In 1978, the rank of specialist 7 was discontinued. In 1979, brass enlisted rank pins were created for wear on black epaulets with the Army green shirt and black "wooly-pully" sweater. In 1985, the ranks of specialist 5 and specialist 6 were discontinued.

2000–present

In 2006, the blue Army Service Uniform (ASU) was adopted to replace the army green uniform, and the yellow-on-blue stripes were reintroduced.

Subsequently, the blue uniform was returned to formal dress use only in 2020, as the army reintroduced a green daily service uniform modeled after the pinks and greens officers service uniform from World War II. The enlisted insignia on this uniform is pale tan stripes on an olive green background.

Command roles

The headquarters of each company-sized unit is assigned a senior non-commissioned officer (NCO) who, as the highest-ranking enlisted person in the company/battery/troop, monitors the enlisted personnel and is their advocate with the commanding officer. This position is known as the "first sergeant," though the person carrying that title does not have to have that rank. In a battalion or larger unit, the senior NCO is a sergeant major. The rank of sergeant major is usually carried by the senior NCO of the S-3 staff section in a battalion, regiment, or a brigade, and in most staff sections in larger units. The command sergeant major fills an advisory function, assisting the commander of a battalion, regiment, brigade, or higher formation in personnel matters. The Sergeant Major of the Army has a similar role assisting the Army Chief of Staff.

In terms of command, the rank of a person typically determines what job and command the soldier has within a unit. For personnel in US Army mechanized infantry, a Bradley infantry fighting vehicle (M2A2) is commanded by a Staff Sergeant, the gun is manned by a Specialist or Sergeant and the driver is Specialist or below. For armor, the Abrams main battle tank (M1A2) is commanded by a captain, lieutenant, sergeant first class or staff sergeant, the gunner is a staff sergeant or sergeant, and the driver and loader are specialists or below.

Forms of address

Forms of address specified in Army Regulation AR 600-20 Army Command Policy are: "Sergeant Major" and "First Sergeant" for those holding those ranks, and "Sergeant" for master sergeants, sergeants first class, staff sergeants, and sergeants. Corporals and specialists are addressed by their rank. Privates first class and privates (both PV1 and PV2) can all be addressed as "Private".

In some cases, informal titles are used. "Top" is commonly used as an informal address to first sergeants or anyone serving as a company first sergeant. In field artillery units a platoon sergeant (usually an E-7) is informally referred to as "Smoke" (from "chief of smoke", a reference to when units fired as whole batteries of between four and six guns, and the senior NCO position was "Chief of Firing Battery"). The junior E-7 position is designated as "Gunnery Sergeant" and similar to the USMC usage, is typically referred to as "Gunny". Field artillery cannon sections are led by section chiefs (usually an E-6) are often informally called "Chief". This does not seem to be common in other section-based unit subdivisions such as staff sections. In some smaller units, with more tight-knit squads, soldiers might call their squad leader "Boss", or a similar respectful term. A habit that has all but died out is the addressing of a platoon sergeant, in any unit other than artillery, being affectionately called a "platoon daddy" in casual conversation or jest (but never in any official communication of any type). In some training units (BCT and AIT or OSUT), trainees are called "Private", regardless of the rank worn. Special titles, such as "drill sergeant" and "gunnery sergeant" are specific to certain jobs (position title), and should not be confused for actual rank. Other services differ, such as the Marine Corps, which address each other by full rank.

Some terms are used jokingly when referring to a soldier's rank. For instance, specialists are sometimes jokingly referred to as "The E-4 Mafia" (referring to their pay grade of E-4), "Command Private Major", "Specialist Major", "Full-Bird Private" (from the eagle on their shield), "Sham Shield" (from their stereotype of "shamming it", or malingering), "PV4", or "Spec-4" (about the old specialist grades, which at one point went up to Specialist 9).

Privates (PV2) rank insignia are sometimes called "Mosquito Wings" (from the appearance of the single chevron). Privates are called "Buck Privates" because they are the lowest rank of private. An E-1 Private may be referred to as "E-Nothing", or "PV-Nothing" (as opposed to PV2, the next rank) due to their lack of rank insignia. E-1 Privates were also called a "Fuzzy" or "E-Fuzzy" during the War on Terror era due to the bare velcro patch-holders on the Army Combat Uniform (ACU).

Timeline of changes
This table shows changes in insignia, from 1905 until the present.

See also
 United States Army officer rank insignia
 United States warrant officer rank insignia

Explanatory notes

References

External links
 
 US Army Rank and Insignia
 Army Regulation 600-20—Table 1-1 lists all current enlisted ranks, the correct form of address, the associated pay grade, and the correct abbreviation.
Naval History and Heritage Command: Chevrons

American non-commissioned personnel
Military insignia
United States Army rank insignia